is a former Japanese football player.

Playing career
Kitade was born in Fukuoka Prefecture on May 14, 1973. After graduating from high school, he joined the Japan Football League club Cerezo Osaka. The club won the championship in 1994 and was promoted to the J1 League in 1995. However he did not play much and retired at the end of the 1997 season.

Club statistics

References

External links

1973 births
Living people
Association football people from Fukuoka Prefecture
Japanese footballers
J1 League players
Japan Football League (1992–1998) players
Cerezo Osaka players
Association football midfielders